Bhamidipati is an Indian surname, commonly found among Telugu Brahmins.

Notable People with surname Bhamidipati 
 Bhamidipati Kameswara Rao was an Indian writer in the Telugu language.
 Bhamidipati Radhakrishna is an Indian playwright and scriptwriter in Telugu cinema.
B. Sai Praneeth is an Indian badminton player.
Bhamidipati Nageswara Sarma.భమిడిపాటి నాగేశ్వర శర్మ, శ్రీవత్సస గోత్రం
Bhamidipati Ramagopalam (1932–2010), popularly known as Bharago, was a humour writer of short stories, critiques and popular novels in Telugu.

Telugu-language surnames